AKC Museum of the Dog is a nonprofit canine museum at 101 Park Avenue in the Murray Hill neighborhood of Manhattan, New York City. The museum features exhibits that include: Dogs in film, dogs of presidents, war dogs, dogs in exploration. The museum features one of the largest collections of dog-related art.

History
The museum began in 1982 with donations from benefactors Frank Sabella, Marie Moore, Nancy-Carol Draper and the Westminster Kennel Foundation. The permanent collection of art consists of Bronze and ceramic sculpture, and paintings. The museum has always been operated by the American Kennel Club.

The museum displays artwork by renowned artists: Edwin Landseer, Maud Earl and Arthur Wardle. Much of the artwork is from the 19th century and the early 20th century.

A great deal of the work is from the late 1800s (the AKC was founded in 1884 ) and the early 20th century, with little abstract or contemporary art.

Previous locations
1982, New York Life Building at 51 Madison Avenue
1987, Queeny Park, West St Louis County, Missouri
2017–present, 101 Park Avenue, New York 10178

Exhibitions
Women and Dogs in Art in the Twentieth Century
Women and Dogs in Art
Dog Days of Summer

References

External links

Museums established in 1982
Museums in Manhattan
Museums of American art
Park Avenue
Murray Hill, Manhattan
History museums in New York City
1982 establishments in New York City